Anousone Xaysa (born 20 March 1994) is a Laotian hurdler. He competed at the 2015 World Championships in Beijing without qualifying for the semifinals. His personal best in the 110 metres hurdles is 14.15 seconds (+1.2 m/s) set in Palembang in 2014. This is the current national record.

He competed for Laos at the 2016 Summer Olympics in Rio de Janeiro in the men's 110 metres hurdles event, where he finished last in his heat. Because this heat and one other took place in heavy rain unlike later heats, there was a re-run for athletes who failed to qualify by right. Xaysa Anousone did not start in that repechage. He was the flag bearer for Laos during the Parade of Nations.

Competition record

References

External links
 

1994 births
Living people
Laotian male hurdlers
World Athletics Championships athletes for Laos
Athletes (track and field) at the 2014 Asian Games
Athletes (track and field) at the 2018 Asian Games
Place of birth missing (living people)
Olympic athletes of Laos
Athletes (track and field) at the 2016 Summer Olympics
Southeast Asian Games medalists in athletics
Southeast Asian Games medalists for Laos
Competitors at the 2013 Southeast Asian Games
Competitors at the 2015 Southeast Asian Games
Asian Games competitors for Laos
Competitors at the 2019 Southeast Asian Games